The 1984 Asian Junior Women's Volleyball Championship was held in Canberra, Australia

Results

|}

Final standing

References
Results (Archived 2014-10-15)

A
V
Asian women's volleyball championships
International volleyball competitions hosted by Australia
Asian Junior